John Lloyd Vaughan Watkins (1802 – 28 September 1865) was a Welsh Liberal politician who sat in the House of Commons in three periods between 1832 and 1865.

Watkins was the son of Rev. Thomas Watkins and his wife Susanna Vaughan. His father was rector of Llandyfaelog. Watkins was educated at Harrow and at  Christ Church, Oxford.

At the 1832 general election Watkins was elected Member of Parliament for Brecon. He held the seat until 1835. He was High Sheriff of Brecknockshire in 1836, and Lord Lieutenant of Brecknockshire from 1847. In 1847 he was re-elected MP for Brecon which he held until 1852. In 1854 he was re-elected again for Brecon and held the seat until his death in 1865.  On 16 November 1847 he was appointed Lieutenant-Colonel Commandant of the Royal Brecknockshire Militia. He retired on 30 August 1860 and was appointed the regiment's first Honorary Colonel.

Watkins lived at Penoyre House where he had an Italianate-style villa built by Anthony Salvin between 1846 and 1848. He died at the age of 63.

References

External links

1802 births
1865 deaths
People educated at Harrow School
Alumni of Christ Church, Oxford
UK MPs 1832–1835
UK MPs 1847–1852
UK MPs 1852–1857
UK MPs 1857–1859
UK MPs 1859–1865
UK MPs 1865–1868
High Sheriffs of Brecknockshire
Brecknockshire Militia officers
Liberal Party (UK) MPs for Welsh constituencies
Lord-Lieutenants of Brecknockshire